Aye Nu Sein (born 24 March 1957 in Sittwe) is a Burmese lawyer and politician. An ethnic Rakhine, she is vice-chair of the Arakan National Party, and a former member of Myanmar's State Administration Council, from 2021 to 2023. She was appointed to the council on 3 February 2021, in the aftermath of the 2021 Myanmar coup d'état. In November 2022, she was awarded the title of Sithu, one of the country's highest honors.

References 

People from Rakhine State
Living people
Burmese people of Rakhine descent
21st-century Burmese lawyers
1957 births
Members of the State Administration Council
Burmese women lawyers
Specially Designated Nationals and Blocked Persons List
Individuals related to Myanmar sanctions